This list of tallest buildings in Seoul ranks skyscrapers in the South Korean capital city of Seoul by height. The tallest in the city is currently the 555 m (1,821 ft) Lotte World Tower with 123 floors.

The tallest buildings are concentrated in four locations: the traditional city center at Jongno, the modern business and financial district in Gangnam along Teheran Road between Gangnam Station and the COEX complex, the financial and political centre on the island of Yeouido, and the affluent residential neighbourhood of Dogok-dong.

Seoul is located in a valley surrounded by mountains with one mountain in the center, Namsan. On top of Namsan is Namsan Tower which is considered an iconic image of the city of Seoul and can be seen from almost anywhere in the city. To maintain this line of sight, many developers have had to set height limits on their buildings.  The city also has strict laws about building heights for reasons of national security stressed by the Korean Air Force and U.S. Air Force.

Tallest buildings
This list ranks Seoul's skyscrapers that stand at least 150m tall, based on standard height measurement. This includes spires and architectural details but does not include antenna masts. Existing structures are included for ranking purposes based on present height.

Timeline of tallest buildings in Seoul

Tallest under construction
This lists ranks Seoul's skyscrapers over 150m that are currently under construction.

Tallest proposed or approved
This lists ranks Seoul's skyscrapers over 150m that are currently proposed/approved for construction.

References

External links 
 Tallest buildings of Seoul on Emporis
 Buildings of Seoul on Skyscraperpage

Seoul
Buildings and structures in Seoul

Tallest